USS Salamaua (CVE-96) was a  of the United States Navy. She was named after the invasion of Salamaua, a strategically important village in the New Guinea Theater during World War II, and one of the main targets of the Salamaua–Lae campaign. She served with distinction during the war, notably being damaged in early 1945 by a kamikaze aircraft during the Invasion of Lingayen Gulf, killing 15 crewmen and injuring 88. Post war, the ship helped repatriate servicemen to the United States as part of Operation Magic Carpet before being decommissioned and struck in 1946, and ultimately being broken up in 1947.

Design and description

Salamaua was a Casablanca-class escort carrier, designed specifically to be mass-produced using prefabricated sections, in order to replace heavy early war losses. Fifty of these escort carriers were built, making them the most numerous type of aircraft carrier ever built. She displaced  normally,  with a full load. She was powered with two Uniflow reciprocating steam engines, which provided , driving two shafts, enabling her to make . Her compact size necessitated the installment of an aircraft catapult at her bow end, and there were two aircraft elevators to facilitate movement of aircraft between the flight and hangar deck: one on the fore, another on the aft.

One /38 caliber dual purpose gun was mounted on the stern, and she was equipped with sixteen  Bofors anti-aircraft guns in twin mounts, as well as twelve  Oerlikon cannons, which were used in an anti-aircraft capability. By the end of the war, Casablanca-class carriers had been modified to carry 30 20–mm cannons, as a response to increasing casualties due to kamikaze attacks. Anti-aircraft guns were mounted around the perimeter of the deck. Casablanca-class escort carriers were designed to carry 27 aircraft, but they sometimes went over or under this number. For example, during the Invasion of Lingayen Gulf, Salamaua carried 14 FM-2 fighters and 10 TBM-3 torpedo bombers, for a total of 24 aircraft. However, during Salamauas anti-submarine sweeps in the closing stages of the war, she carried 18 FM-2 fighters, 2 FM-2P variant fighters, and 12 TBM-3E variant torpedo bombers, for a total of 32 aircraft. While she was transporting aircraft in a non-combat role, she could accommodate up to 50 aircraft, provided her flight deck was also used for storage.

Construction
The escort carrier was laid down on 4 February 1944, under a Maritime Commission contract, MC hull 1133, by Kaiser Shipbuilding Company, Vancouver, Washington. When she was ordered in 1942, she was expected to possess the name Anguilla Bay, as part of the US Navy's policy of naming escort carriers after bays and sounds. On 6 November 1943, before she was laid down, she was renamed to Salamaua, as part of a new policy which named escort carriers after sites of naval or land engagements. She was launched on 22 April 1944; sponsored by Mrs. W. J. Mullins; transferred to the United States Navy and commissioned on 26 May 1944, Captain Joseph Irwin Taylor, Jr in command, and with a partial complement of 54 officers and 518 enlisted men.

Service history
Following her commission, she proceeded through the Strait of Juan de Fuca on 17 June 1944, taking on armaments and conducting tests at Naval Station Bremerton from 18 June to 22 June. On 22 June, she arrived at Seattle, Washington, where she took on a load of damaged aircraft, bound for San Diego. As she proceeded down the West Coast, she underwent shakedown, pausing at the naval supply depot in Oakland. She arrived at San Diego, on 29 June, where she unloaded her aircraft. She then conducted drills off the coast of Baja California, for four days, returning to San Diego, on 4 July, where she took on an aircraft contingent and cargo. Salamaua left San Diego, on 6 July, arriving at Pearl Harbor, on 12 July, where she unloaded her wares for the next four days. She left Pearl Harbor, on 16 July, arriving at Naval Air Station Alameda, on 22 July, where she took on 50 aircraft and 300 passengers, bound for Finschhafen, New Guinea.

Salamaua departed Alameda, California, on the morning of 24 July, passing south of Hawaii, on 29 July, arriving at Finschhafen, on 12 August, where she took on a load of nonfunctional aircraft. She departed New Guinea, on 14 August, stopping at Palikulo Bay, to take on fuel. On 1 September, she returned to Alameda, where she underwent overhaul and conducted training exercises. She departed on 3 September, transporting cargo to San Diego, where she arrived on 4 September. On 26 September, she received her combat aircraft contingent (VC-87) at Naval Base San Diego.

She paused at Pearl Harbor on 23 October, and arrived at Ulithi on 5 November. A tropical disturbance delayed departure until 10 November, when she set off for Leyte Gulf, pausing at Kossol Roads, to replenish fuel. She departed on 13 November, and from 14 November to 23 November, she furnished air screening for convoys in the Leyte Gulf area, without major incident. On 23 November, a Mitsubishi G4M bomber managed to get through the screen, strafing the carriers without much ill effect before being shot down. She then proceeded to the Admiralty Islands, to prepare for the invasion of Luzon, as part of Carrier Division 29, under the command of Rear Admiral Durgin. En route, the destroyers  and  detected a potential submarine on 26 November, and dropped depth charges. She, along with her task group, arrived at Seeadler Harbor on 27 November. She stayed at anchor until 16 December, when she left to engage in training exercises at Huon Gulf. On 21 December, she returned to Seeadler Harbor, to make final preparations for the planned invasion of Lingayen Gulf.

Lingayen Gulf
She departed Seeadler Harbor, on the afternoon of 27 December, and moved north to a massive escort carrier formation at Kossol Roads, on 30 December. On 1 January 1945, the task group left for Luzon, passing Leyte, on 3 January. The following day, 4 January 1945, her task group was engaged by kamikazes. On the afternoon of 4 January 1945, she was transiting the Sulu Sea, to the west of the Philippines. These planes split into two groups, one group heading towards the rear of the task group, whilst the other continued on its course towards the center. Although fighters from the carrier group were scrambled, false radar signals hampered their efforts to intercept, resulting in the shooting down of just one Japanese plane. During the early stages of the attack, one kamikaze made for Salamaua, but it was discouraged by heavy anti-aircraft fire, changing course instead to make for Lunga Point before being shot down.

On 5 January, her task group was harried by more kamikazes, and two planes were shot down by Salamauas anti-aircraft gunners. The kamikazes did succeed in damaging the cruiser , however. On 6 January, she arrived off the entrance to Lingayen Gulf. Her planes began blasting enemy positions ashore and providing air cover for the approaching Allied ships. On 9 January, they provided air cover for the troops landing on the assault beaches, then continued that support until 13 January, when she was forced to retire.

In the days prior to 13 January, fueling operations for the task group had been underway, which was complicated significantly by rough seas which snapped hoses. On 13 January 1945, the task group relocated  to the west of Lingayen Gulf, where fueling recommenced. At 09:00 in the morning, Salamaua was scheduled to be refueled by an oiler.

At 08:58, a Japanese kamikaze plane, emerging from cloud cover, unexpectedly dove almost vertically towards Salamauas flight deck. The speed of its descent, as well as the task group being on low alert, meant that the kamikaze was able to carry out its attack unmolested by anti-aircraft fire. Admiral Durgin, querying Salamaua as to the origin of the smoke, received a reply that "Something just went through our flight deck". One of the bombs detonated near the tank tops, just above the bilge, narrowly missing the bomb stowage compartment. The blast sent debris from the engine and fuselage rocketing onto the flight deck, collapsing a number of bulkheads. Additionally, it sparked multiple fires throughout the flight deck, hangar deck, and engine room. Inside the hangar deck, aircraft were being readied for a strike, and the existence of armed munitions made the situation tenuous. There was immediate loss of power, communications, and steering throughout the ship. The aft engine room was breached and flooded, rendering the starboard engine inoperational, albeit the flooding extinguished the engine room blaze.

Several fires were kindled, but most of the blazes were quickly put under control, with the exception of a major fire within the hangar deck, which was fed by gasoline saturated debris from the flight deck. Fighting the fire was further complicated by the loss of water main pressure along the aft of the ship, and by the detonation of hydrostatic fuses and various other ammunition. After 30 minutes, the blaze was contained, after a fight which first belayed, then prevented the detonation of more munitions. A more pressing concern was flooding, which an entire day of pumping could not alleviate. This resulted in the entire starboard engine being submerged, leading to the ship acquiring an 8° list to the starboard. The attack on Salamaua was the last successful kamikaze attack in the Philippines Campaign.

There were more kamikazes which followed up in the 10 minutes after the attack on Salamaua, but the Japanese had lost the element of surprise. One plane dove towards , but was engaged by heavy anti-aircraft fire, including from Salamaua, and it veered towards  before being destroyed by a proximity-fuzed 5-inch shell. Another two planes tried to strike Salamaua, one passing above her port quarter before crashing into the sea, and another one detonating in midair as it approached her astern. Throughout this ordeal, she was able to keep up with her task group using her port engine. Fifteen men were killed, and 88 injured by the attack.

Okinawa
Salamaua limped into Leyte, still hampered significantly by flooding, on 14 January. There, injured were unloaded, the worst of the wreckage was cleaned up, and flooding was partially controlled. After repairs, she set off for Seeadler Harbor, arriving on 2 February, for repairs on floating dry dock, where her aircraft contingent and crew were disembarked. She arrived on 17 February, where she unloaded unnecessary ammunition, and departed on 19 February, bound for San Francisco.

Arriving on 26 February, she was put in a queue for repairs. Repairs began on 3 March, and on 21 April, she moved west again. She arrived back at Pearl Harbor on 27 April, and received her new aircraft contingent (VC-70). She concluded her exercises and returned on 4 May, and set off for Guam, on 10 May, arriving on 20 May. At Guam, she received orders to join Task Group 52.2.1., which was supporting operations on the Ryukyu Islands.

Typhoon and anti-submarine operations
She arrived at her post on 4 June, but the next day, Typhoon Connie passed directly over the Third Fleet. On the morning of 5 June, the task group was refueling, but the weather deteriorated to render it impossible by noon. Reports of a typhoon to the south led Captain Joseph I. Taylor to order as many aircraft as possible to be sheltered within the hangar bay. Her limited carrying capabilities forced some aircraft to be stored on the flight deck, where they were bolted down onto the tarmac. By late afternoon, the task group was being buffeted by tropical storm force winds, and at 3:30, 5 June, hurricane force winds were reported. Steering control was lost by 3:35, as massive waves pounded the ship. A fore 40–mm gun and the aircraft handling boom was carted away by the waves. The flight deck was partially detached at the extreme fore, damaging the aircraft catapult and some bulkheads. On the flight deck, an Avenger tore loose from its restraints, spinning wildly across, wrecking all of the aircraft anchored onto the flight deck and killing a crewman. By the time the task force emerged from the typhoon, 46 planes had been destroyed, mostly on Salamaua and Bougainville. Salamauas flight deck had been rendered inoperative, and she arrived at Guam, on 10 June, to undergo repairs.

Repairs were hastily made at Guam, and she arrived at Ulithi, on 18 July. Their objective was to protect the Marianas-Okinawa convoy lanes. On 31 July, she shifted to the Leyte-Okinawa lanes, as a reaction to the sinking of the destroyer escort  and the cruiser  by Japanese submarines. On 5 August, Captain Joseph I. Taylor relinquished command of Salamaua, being replaced by Captain John Hook Griffin. She undertook anti-submarine duties until the Japanese surrender on 15 August. Task Group 94.17 cleared naval mines, and achieved the likely destruction of two Japanese midget submarines, along with the possible destruction of another midget submarine.

Post-war
On 25 August, Salamaua returned to Leyte, replenished, then escorted a troop convoy on 27 August, containing the U.S. Eighth Army to Tokyo Bay. The convoy arrived on 2 September, and the escort carrier's planes photographed the landing of the occupation troops at Yokohama, during the formal Japanese surrender aboard the battleship . After guarding a second convoy into Tokyo Bay, she joined the "Magic Carpet" fleet, which embarked veterans for transport to the United States. She disembarked her first cargo of veterans at Alameda, on 3 October. Before the end of the year, Salamaua completed two more "Magic Carpet" runs.

In 1946, she was prepared for inactivation. She was decommissioned on 9 May 1946, struck from the Naval Vessel Register on 21 May, and subsequently sold to the Zidell Ship Dismantling Company, Portland, Oregon, for scrapping on 18 November 1946. Her hull was broken up sometime in 1947.

References

Sources

Online sources

Bibliography

External links 

 

 

Casablanca-class escort carriers
World War II escort aircraft carriers of the United States
Ships built in Vancouver, Washington
1944 ships
S4-S2-BB3 ships